New Harmony is an unincorporated community in western Pike County, in the U.S. state of Missouri. The community is on a county road just east of Missouri Route V about six miles east of Vandalia and four miles south-southeast of Curryville.

History
New Harmony was platted in 1857.  A post office called New Harmony was established in 1858, and remained in operation until 1904.  A variant name was "Harmony". The name may be a transfer from Harmony, Kentucky.

References

Unincorporated communities in Pike County, Missouri
1857 establishments in Missouri
Unincorporated communities in Missouri